There have been a number of councils held at Troyes:

Council of 867
The council was held on orders of Pope Nicholas I, to deal with Hincmar of Reims and his quarrels.  The decrees were signed on 2 November 867.  The Council ruled that no bishop could be deposed from his See without the consent of the Pope.

Bishops present

Hincmar, Archbishop of Reims
Herard, Bishop of Tours
Wenilo, Bishop of Rouen
Frotarius, Bishop of Bordeaux
Hegilo, Bishop of Sens
irizarri, Bishop of Bourges
Rothadus, Bishop of Soissons
Actardus, Bishop of Nantes
Hildegarius, Bishop of Meaux
Aeneas, Bishop of Paris
Hincmar, Bishop of Laon
Gislibertus, Bishop of Chartres
Ercanraus, Bishop of Châlons-sur-Marne
Ercambertus, Bishop of Bayeux
Odo, Bishop of 
Folcricus, Bishop of St.-Paul-trois-Châteaux
Livido, Bishop of Autun
Ioannes, Bishop of Cambrai
Hilduinus, Bishop of Évreux
Abbo, Bishop of Nevers

Council of 878 (Second Council of Troyes)
 878  Second Council of Troyes 
 Pope John VIII proclaimed that no bishop could be deposed without reference to the Holy See

Bishops present

John, Bishop of Rome
Walbertus, Bishop of Porto
Petrus, Bishop of Forum Sempronii (Fossombrone)
Pascasius, Bishop
Hincmar, Archbishop of Reims
Ansegisus, Archbishop of Sens
Aurelianus, Archbishop of Lyon
Sigebodus, Archbishop of Narbonne
Rostagnus, Archbishop of Arles
Adalardus, Archbishop of Tours
Teudericus Archbishop of Besançon
Ottramnus, Archbishop of Vienne
Isaac, Bishop of Langres
Gerboldus, Bishop of Châlons-sur-Saône
Agilmarus, Bishop of Clermont (Arvernensis)
Bernerus, Bishop of Grenoble
Abbo, Bishop of Nevers
Ottulfus, Bishop of Tréguier
Gislebertus, Bishop of Chartres
Walefridus, Bishop of Uzés
Hildebaldus, Bishop of Soissons
Teutherus, Bishop of Gerona
Ingelwinus, Bishop of Paris
Edenulfus, Bishop of Laon
Adebertus, Bishop of Senlis
Berno, Bishop of Chalons
Maricus, Bishop of Béziers
Ecfridus, Bishop of Poitiers
Abbo, Bishop of Maguelonne
Frodoinus, Bishop of Barcelona
Arnaldus, Bishop of Toul

Council of 1078

Summoned By Archbishop Hugues de Die and the Abbot of Cluny.

Council of 1104
Convened by Cardinal Richard, Bishop of Albano, Papal Legate

Council of 1107

Convened on 23 May 1107 by Pope Paschal II personally.  Rothard, Bishop of Mainz, was suspended from office because he had dared to reconcile a schismatic bishop, Udo of Hildesheim, to the Church.

Bishops attending
No complete list survives.  Some bishops who probably attended can be discovered in surviving documents:

Pope Paschal II
Cardinal Richard, Bishop of Albano
Aldo, Bishop of Piacenza
Odo, Bishop of Cambrai
Leodegarus, Bishop of Bourges
Girard, Bishop of Angoulême
ldebertus, Bishop of Le Mans
Ioannes, Bishop of Thérouanne
Gotofridus, Bishop of Amiens
Galo, Bishop of Paris 
Lambertus, Bishop of Arras

Council of 1129

 1129 - convened by Bernard of Clairvaux:
 recognized and confirmed the Order of the Knights Templar
 solved disputes involving the Bishop of Paris

Notes

References

Bibliography

 (tr. H. Leclercq)
 (tr. H. Leclercq)[Council of Troyes, 867]

9th-century church councils
12th-century church councils
Troyes